The Muñoz Seca Theater (Teatro Muñoz Seca) is a theater in Madrid, Spain.  The theater is named after playwright Pedro Muñoz Seca.  

During the Second Spanish Republic Pilar Millán Astray led the theater.

References

Further reading
Antonio Castro. "Teatro Muñoz Seca, los tiempos del cuplé". Actores|93.  Accessed April 13, 2012.  

Theatres in Spain
Entertainment venues in Madrid
Buildings and structures in Sol neighborhood, Madrid